The Institute of Business Ethics or IBE is a non-profit professional organisation based in London, which encourages high standards of business behaviour based on ethical values. They raise public awareness of the importance of doing business ethically, and collaborate with other UK and international organisations with interests and expertise in business ethics.

Overview
The IBE helps organisations to strengthen their ethics culture to encourage high standards of business behaviour based on ethical values.  The IBE assists in the development, implementation and embedding of effective and relevant ethics and corporate responsibility policies and programmes.  In addition, the IBE helps organisations to provide guidance to employees and build relationships of trust with their principal stakeholders.

The Institute's main aim is to raise public awareness of the importance of doing business ethically, and collaborate with other UK and international organisations with interests and expertise in business ethics.

History
The Institute of Business Ethics was founded in 1986 by businesses concerned that, following the deregulation of the City of London, ‘one’s word would no longer be one’s bond’. The Big Bang radically changed the way the London Stock Exchange operated, doing away with much of what was seen by critics as ‘the old boys’ network’ and internationalising London’s financial markets.

Originally, it operated as a fund within the Christian Association of Business Executives (CABE), a registered charity established to promote the study and application of Christian moral principles in the conduct of business.

In 2000, the Institute obtained separate charitable status; its charitable article being "to advance public education in business ethics and related subjects with particular reference to the study and application of ethical standards in the management and conduct of industry and business generally in the United Kingdom and elsewhere".

Since its founding, the IBE has published more than 20 books on business ethics topics; conducted surveys on the use of codes of ethics within companies; developed training programmes in business ethics, from induction programmes to the board room; worked with academics and business schools to promote the study of business ethics within MBA and business studies courses; and offered advice and support to business ethics practitioners and their companies.

References

IBE Website

External links
Institute of Business Ethics
Coubertin Olympic Awards Student Essay Competition
The Telegraph
European Business Ethics Network

1986 establishments in the United Kingdom
Business ethics organizations
Business organisations based in London
Organisations based in the City of Westminster
Organizations established in 1986
Business Ethics